Francis Borgia  (28 October 1510 – 30 September 1572) was a Spanish Jesuit priest. The great-grandson of Pope Alexander VI, he was Duke of Gandía and a grandee of Spain. After the death of his wife, Borgia renounced his titles and became a priest in the Society of Jesus, later serving as its third superior general. He was canonized on 20 June 1670 by Pope Clement X.

Early life
He was born in the Duchy of Gandía in the Kingdom of Valencia (part of Aragon), on 28 October 1510. His father was Juan Borgia, 3rd Duke of Gandía, the son of Giovanni Borgia, the son of Pope Alexander VI (Rodrigo Borgia). His mother was Juana, daughter of Alonso de Aragón, Archbishop of Zaragoza, who, in turn, was the illegitimate son of King Ferdinand II of Aragon. His brother, Tomás de Borja y Castro, also entered the Church, becoming Bishop of Málaga, and later Archbishop of Zaragoza.

As a child he was very pious and wished to become a monk, but his family sent him instead to serve in the court of Charles V, Holy Roman Emperor (who was also King Charles I of Spain), where he was welcomed warmly. He excelled there, accompanying the Emperor on several campaigns.

Adult life and career
In Madrid in the month of September 1529, he married a Portuguese noblewoman, Leonor de Castro Mello y Meneses. They had eight children: Carlos in 1530, Isabel in 1532, Juan in 1533, Álvaro circa 1535, Juana also circa 1535, Fernando in 1537, Dorotea in 1538, and Alfonso in 1539. Charles V appointed him Marquess of Lombay, master of the hounds, and equerry to the empress.

In 1539, he convoyed the corpse of Isabella of Portugal, Philip II of Spain's mother, to her burial place in Granada. In that same year (1539), he became Viceroy of Catalonia, replacing Fadrique de Portugal y Noroña, though he was only 29.

In these earlier years of his life he enjoyed composing musical ecclesiastical pieces.  In these pieces he displayed a remarkable contrapuntal style, justifying the assertion that, "In the sixteenth century and prior to Palestrina, Borgia was one of the chief restorers of sacred music."

In 1543 upon the death of his father, the 3rd Duke, Francis became the 4th Duke of Gandía. His diplomatic abilities came into question after his failed attempt at arranging a marriage between Prince Philip of Spain and the Princess of Portugal, thus ending a hope of bringing these two countries together, and resulting in his retirement as duke, handing his title to his son, Carlos. By then 33 years old, he had retired to his native place and devoted himself to religious activities.

Jesuit priest

In 1546 his wife Eleanor died, and Francis then decided to enter the newly formed Society of Jesus, after making adequate provisions for his children. He put his affairs in order circa 1551, renounced his titles in favour of his eldest son Carlos de Borja-Aragon y de Castro-Melo, and became a Jesuit priest. He helped in the establishment of what is now the Gregorian University in Rome. Upon Francis’ return from a journey to Peru, Pope Julius III made known his intention to make him a cardinal. To prevent this, Borgia decided, in agreement with St. Ignatius, to leave the city secretly and go to the Basque Country, where it was thought he would be safe from the papal desires. He felt incompletion  to spend time in seclusion and prayer, but his administrative talents also made him a natural for other tasks. In time his friends persuaded him to accept the leadership role that nature and circumstances had destined him for: in 1554, he became the Jesuit commissary-general in Spain, where he founded a dozen colleges. After only two years, St. Francis was crowned for missions in the East and West Indies. In 1565, he was elected the third "Father General" or Superior General of the Society of Jesus, after the death in January 1565 of Diego Laynez, (Almazán, Spain, 1512 – January 1565).

His successes during the period 1565–1572 made historians to describe Francis as the greatest General after Saint Ignatius. He founded the Collegium Romanum, which was to become the Gregorian University, advised kings and popes, and closely supervised all the affairs of the mushrooming order. Yet, despite being the supreme, Francis led a humble life and was acclaimed in his own lifetime as a saint.

Francis Borgia died in 1572.

Death and legacy

Francis Borgia died on 30 September 1572, in Rome. His mortal remains were repatriated to Spain in 1617 and kept from 1627 at the Jesuit professed house in Madrid that was newly built for that purpose north of Plaza Mayor on a donation from Francisco Gómez de Sandoval y Rojas, 1st Duke of Lerma. After that church was destroyed by arson in 1931, some of his ashes were recovered and eventually reinterred in the new Jesuit complex on calle de Serrano.

Francis Borgia was beatified in Madrid on 23 November 1624, by Pope Urban VIII. He was canonized nearly 35 years later on 20 June 1670, by Pope Clement X. His liturgical feast was inserted into the General Roman Calendar in 1688 for celebration on 10 October, the date then free from other celebrations that was closest to that of his death.

Parishes are dedicated to St. Francis Borgia in Chicago, Illinois, Sturgis, Kentucky, Washington, Missouri, Blair, Nebraska, and Cedarburg, Wisconsin. Also in the village of Isio in the town of Cauayan, Negros Occidental, Philippines. The Jesuit-founded city of São Borja, in southern Brazil, is named after him.

St. Francis Borgia Regional High School is located in Washington, Missouri.

Descendants 
 Carlos, 5th Duke de Gandía
 Francisco Tomas, 6th Duke de Gandía
 Íñigo de Borja
 Gaspar de Borja y Velasco
 Baltasar de Borja y Velasco
 Juan de Borja y Castro
 Fernando de Borja y Castro
 Juan Buenaventura de Borja y Armendia
 Isabel 
 Francisco Gómez de Sandoval, 1st Duke of Lerma
 Juana Gómez de Sandoval
 Luisa de Guzmán

Ancestry

Music 
Marc-Antoine Charpentier, Motet pour St François de Borgia, H.354, for 1 voice, 2 treble instruments, and continuo (? late 1680s)

See also 
 House of Borgia
 Route of the Borgias
 Statue of Francis Borgia, Charles Bridge

References

Bibliography
Candido de Dalmases, Francis Borgia. Grandee of Spain, Jesuit, Saint, Saint-Louis, 1991
Candido de Dalmases, El Padre Francisco de Borja, Madrid, 1983.24 pages. Madrid: Editorial Católica, (1983). ISBN, 8422011166,  
Margaret Yeo, The greatest of the Borgias, New York, 1936, 374 pages
Enrique García Hernán, Sanctus Franciscus Borgia: Quartus Gandiae Dux et Societatis Iesu Praepositus Generalis Tertius, 1510-1572 , Volumen 156, Monumenta Borgia Series Volumes 156–157,  Monumenta Historica Societatis Iesu (1903) (new edition by Edit. Generalitat Valeciana, 2003)
Enrique García Hernán, Francisco de Borja, Grande de España, 1999 reprint by Institució Alfons el Magnànim, (Diputació de Valência),  of the 1903 edition, 292 pages, 
 Francisco de Borja, Santo y Duque de Gandia (1510-2010) by several authors in several subjects, Bromera edit., 2010,	
 Angel Santos Hernandez, Jesuitas y Obispados: la Compañia de Jesús y las dignidades eclesiasticas,(1999), 539 pages,in Spanish, Universidad Pontificia de Comillas edit. , https://books.google.com/books?id=QRzrJ9EPmaIC. a Google book to be found under:
 María Rosa Urraca Pastor, San Francisco de Borja, Barcelona 1943

External links 

Tradition in Action - Saint of the Day: St. Francis Borgia
  Diario Borja - Borgia
  Borja - Wikipedia, la enciclopedia libre
  Borgia - Wikipedia, la enciclopedia libre
  Borja o Borgia
  Francisco Fernández de Bethencourt - Historia Genealógica y Heráldica Española, Casa Real y Grandes de España, tomo cuarto 
  Una rama subsistente del linaje Borja en América española, por Jaime de Salazar y Acha, Académico de Número de la Real Academia Matritense de Heráldica y Genealogía
  Boletín de la Real Academia Matritense de Heráldica y Genealogía

Jesuit saints
1510 births
1572 deaths
Roman Catholic saints from the Valencian Community
Superiors General of the Society of Jesus
Spanish Roman Catholic saints
Counter-Reformation
Francis
Francis
16th-century Spanish Jesuits
Catholic exorcists
Viceroys of Catalonia
16th-century Christian saints
204
Grandees of Spain
Spanish exorcists
Beatifications by Pope Urban VIII
Canonizations by Pope Clement X